The 2020 FA Challenge Cup was the 47th edition of the FA Challenge Cup, Botswana's premier football knockout tournament. It was sponsored by Orange and was known as the Orange FA Cup or Orange FA Cup Season 2 for sponsorship reasons. It started with the preliminary round on the weekend of 14 December 2019 and concluded with the final on 11 December 2021.

Orapa United were the defending champions but were eliminated by Gaborone United in the round of 16.

Qualifying rounds
All 16 Premier League teams automatically qualified to the round of 32. The top 8 teams from First Division South and top 8 from First Division North had to go through the preliminary round and were joined by the 16 regional champions. Winners of this round qualified for the round of 32.

Preliminary round
The preliminary round draw took place on 23 January 2019. The draw was seeded into two, namely the northern and southern blocks. Southern block games were played on 16 and 17 February while northern block games were played on 23 and 24 February.

Southern block

Northern block

Round of 32
The round of 32 draw was conducted on 18 January 2020. It was not seeded. King Rodgers, Tsabotlhe, and Tonota from Division One were the lowest ranked teams still in the competition.

Round of 16
The round of 16 draw was conducted on 4 April 2019. It was not seeded. Jwaneng Fighters, Sand Diamonds and Kazungula Young Fighters from Division One are the lowest ranked teams still in the competition.

References

Football competitions in Botswana
Football in Botswana